William Frith may refer to:

 William Powell Frith (1819–1909), English artist
 William Silver Frith (1850–1924), English sculptor
 William Frith (politician) (1883–1960), Australian politician
 William Frith (English cricketer) (1871–1956), English cricketer
 William Frith (New Zealand cricketer) (1856–1949), New Zealand cricketer
 Billy Frith (1912–1996), English football player and manager

See also
 Frith (disambiguation)